Leandro Carlos Silveira Niehues (born 14 March 1973) is a Brazilian football coach, who is currently the assistant manager of Santo André.

Honours
Inter de Lages
Campeonato Catarinense Série B: 2014

References

External links
 Futebol de Goyaz profile 
 

1973 births
Living people
People from Toledo, Paraná
Brazilian football managers
Campeonato Brasileiro Série A managers
Campeonato Brasileiro Série C managers
Club Athletico Paranaense managers
Arapongas Esporte Clube managers
Esporte Clube Internacional de Lages managers
Luverdense Esporte Clube managers
Volta Redonda Futebol Clube managers
Rio Branco Sport Club managers
Vila Nova Futebol Clube managers
Paysandu Sport Club managers
Operário Ferroviário Esporte Clube managers
Sportspeople from Paraná (state)